Uncle Sam and His Battering Ram is a World War I song written by Robert P. Hall and composed by Ida K. Mervine. The song was first published in 1918 by Mervine & Hall Music in Phoenix, AZ. The sheet music cover features Uncle Sam pointing to the Kaiser as a ram butts him in the stomach.
 
The sheet music can be found at the Pritzker Military Museum & Library.

References 

Bibliography
Parker, Bernard S. World War I Sheet Music Vol 2. Jefferson: McFarland & Company, Inc., 2007. . 
Paas, John Roger. 2014. America sings of war: American sheet music from World War I. . 
Vogel, Frederick G. World War I Songs: A History and Dictionary of Popular American Patriotic Tunes, with Over 300 Complete Lyrics. Jefferson: McFarland & Company, Inc., 1995. . 

1918 songs
Songs of World War I